Sorbo may refer to:

People
 Gunnar Sørbø (born 1948), a social anthropologist and a former director of the Chr. Michelsen Institute (CMI)
 Jan Inge Sørbø (born 1954), a Norwegian philologist, author, and poet
 Kari Sørbø (born 1955), a Norwegian radio personality
 Kevin Sorbo (born 1958), an American actor
 Sam Sorbo (born 1966), an American actress

Places
 Sorbo-Ocagnano, a commune in Haute-Corse department on the island of Corsica, France
 Sorbo San Basile, a village in Catanzaro, Calabria, Italy
 Sorbo Serpico, a town in Avellino, Campania, Italy
 Sorbo (Tagliacozzo), a frazione in L'Aquila, Abruzzo, Italy
 Sørbø, a village in Rennesøy municipality, Rogaland county, Norway

Other
Sorbo, a type of rubber used in various products, like the Mk 2 mine
Sorbo, Italian for the sorb apple family of trees